Idylwyld Drive is an arterial road in Saskatoon, Saskatchewan. It is one of the main roads in and out of the downtown area of the city.

On the south side of the Senator Sid Buckwold Bridge, it is a freeway and was initially designated as the Idylwyld Freeway (since 2013, the southern portion of the road has also been designated as Idylwyld Drive). It merges into Circle Drive at an interchange completed in 2013. At its north end the road divides into two highways, Highway 11 and Highway 12.

The oldest section of Idylwyld Drive used to be known as Avenue A, the easternmost of the "lettered" north-south streets. In 1966, the Canadian National Railway tracks were relocated out of the downtown; the former railway bridge was demolished and replaced by a traffic bridge; and the former railroad right-of-way south of the river was made into the Idylwyld Freeway.  The freeway crossed the river at the bridge and connected at 20th Street to Avenue A, renamed Idylwyld Drive.  Two blocks of Avenue A still exist south of 20th Street, as a small remnant.

As with the city's other major transitional arterials, 22nd Street West and 8th Street East, Idylwyld Drive features a mixture of uses. At its southern end, on the border of the Central Business District and Riversdale business areas, commercial uses dominate. North of 25th Street, residential dominates the west side of the street, with a mix of hotels, motels, schools and institutional uses, including the Saskatoon campus of Saskatchewan Polytechnic (formerly called SIAST Kelsey Campus). North of 33rd Street, a mix of single-family residential and commercial is featured until approximately 36th Street, at which point the road becomes a commercial district. North of Circle Drive, the street elevates to freeway status and passes through suburban commercial and industrial regions until it exits the city.

Beginning with its intersection with 20th Street and continuing north to the city limits, Idylwyld Drive serves as the dividing line for designating "East" and "West" addresses for the west side of Saskatoon (the remnant of Avenue A serves the same purpose south of 20th).

Exits and intersections

References

Streets in Saskatoon
Freeways in Saskatchewan
Urban segments of the Trans-Canada Highway
Yellowhead Highway